The 1985 Toronto Indoor (also known as the Molson Light Challenge for sponsorship reasons) was a tennis tournament played on indoor carpet courts in Toronto, Ontario, Canada that was part of the 1985 Nabisco Grand Prix. Kevin Curren won in the final 7–6, 6–3 against Anders Järryd.

Seeds

  Anders Järryd (final)
  Eliot Teltscher (semifinals)
  Kevin Curren (champion)
  Jimmy Arias (first round)
  Gene Mayer (quarterfinals)
  Ramesh Krishnan (quarterfinals)
  John Sadri (first round)
  Bob Green (first round)

Draw

Finals

Top half

Bottom half

References

1985 Singles
1985 Grand Prix (tennis)